Ginette Martenot (1902–1996) was a French pianist, and an expert and leading performer on the twentieth-century electronic instrument the ondes Martenot, which was invented by her brother Maurice. At the age of sixteen, she entered the Paris Conservatory, where she studied counterpoint and fugue with the composer Arthur Honegger. She gave the first performance (and subsequently made recordings) as solo ondist in Messiaen's Turangalîla-Symphonie, with Yvonne Loriod taking the solo piano part.

Martenot taught the composer Serge Nigg.

References

External links
Ginette Martenot (in French)

1902 births
1996 deaths
Musicians from Paris
Conservatoire de Paris alumni
Ondists
20th-century French male classical pianists
Commandeurs of the Ordre des Arts et des Lettres